Two highways in the U.S. state of Nevada have been signed as Route 80:
Interstate 80 in Nevada, part of the Interstate Highway System
Nevada State Route 80 (1940s), which existed until the 1970s renumbering